Longue Vue House and Gardens, also known as Longue Vue, is a historic house museum and associated gardens at 7 Bamboo Road in the Lakewood neighborhood of New Orleans, Louisiana, United States.

The former home of Edgar Stern and Edith Rosenwald Stern (daughter of Julius Rosenwald), the current house is in fact the second.  The original house and gardens began in 1924.  In 1934, landscape architect Ellen Biddle Shipman began to work with the Sterns on the designs of their gardens.  Through the re-working of the gardens the Sterns decided that their house did not allow them to fully enjoy their new grounds, and the original house was subsequently moved and a new one erected in its place starting in 1939.  This new house was designed by architects William and Geoffrey Platt whose father, Charles A. Platt, was Shipman's mentor. The four facades of the house have four different appearances and out each of the four sides there is a different garden.  It has 20 rooms on three stories, with original furnishings.

The gardens include Arecaceae, Asclepias tuberosa, azaleas, caladium, Callicarpa americana, camellia, Canna, Chionanthus retusus, chrysanthemum, crape myrtle, cyclamen, Delphinium, Ficus carica, Gossypium, hydrangea, Koelreuteria bipinnata, Louisiana irises, Lycoris aurea, Narcissus, Passiflora incarnata, Phytolacca americana, Euphorbia pulcherrima, roses, Stigmaphyllon ciliatum, tulips, vitex, and Zingiber zerumbet.

Longue Vue was listed on the National Register of Historic Places in 1991, and further was declared a National Historic Landmark in 2005.  It was deemed nationally significant for its association with Shipman, and as the only major work of Shipman's where she exerted complete creative control over the landscape.

Following damage by Hurricane Katrina, volunteer and staff labor later enabled the house to reopen for tours.

See also
List of National Historic Landmarks in Louisiana
National Register of Historic Places listings in Orleans Parish, Louisiana

References

External links 

 Longue Vue House & Gardens

Gardens in Louisiana
Botanical gardens in Louisiana
Historic house museums in Louisiana
Open-air museums in Louisiana
Museums in New Orleans
Houses on the National Register of Historic Places in Louisiana
National Historic Landmarks in Louisiana
Culture of New Orleans
1939 establishments in Louisiana
Houses in New Orleans
Greek Revival houses in Louisiana
Neoclassical architecture in Louisiana
Landscape design history of the United States
National Register of Historic Places in New Orleans